The greater forest shrew (Sylvisorex ollula) is a species of mammal in the family Soricidae found in Cameroon, the Central African Republic, the Republic of the Congo, Equatorial Guinea, Gabon, and Nigeria. Its natural habitat is subtropical or tropical moist lowland forest.

References

Sylvisorex
Taxonomy articles created by Polbot
Mammals described in 1913
Taxa named by Oldfield Thomas